Jouni Loponen (born 1 July 1971) is a Finnish ice hockey defender. He played for the Spokane Chiefs in 1988–89, he is a 4-times Finnish champion and in 2004, he won Elitserien.

Career statistics

References

External links
 Eurohockey.net profile

Finnish ice hockey defencemen
Spokane Chiefs players
HC TPS players
Living people
1971 births